Never Enders is the eleventh studio album by American country music band Lonestar, produced single-handedly by band member Dean Sams. It was released on April 29, 2016 via Shanachie Records. The album's lead single and title track was delivered to country radio on March 17, 2016. This is the final Lonestar album to feature lead singer Richie McDonald after his second departure from the band, which was announced in March 2021.

Track listing

Personnel 
Lonestar
 Richie McDonald – lead vocals
 Dean Sams – acoustic piano, Fender Rhodes, Hammond B3 organ, acoustic guitar, backing vocals 
 Michael Britt – electric guitars
 Keech Rainwater – drums

Additional musicians
 Jimmy Nichols – Hammond B3 organ, strings
 Kenny Greenberg – electric guitars
 Derek Weils – electric guitars
 Ilya Toshinsky – acoustic guitar
 Biff Watson – acoustic guitar
 Paul Franklin – steel guitar
 Mark Hill – bass guitar
 Eric Darken – percussion
 Perry Coleman – backing vocals

Production
 Dean Sams – producer, digital editing
 Brady Barnett – digital editing
 Mills Logan – mixing, tracking engineer
 Josh Ditty – second engineer
 Ernesto Olvera – second engineer
 Ken Love – mastering at Five Points Mastering (Nashville, Tennessee)
 Jon-Paul Bruno – photography
 Glenn Sweltzer – art direction, design

Charts

References

2016 albums
Lonestar albums